Tangáxuan I was the fourth Cazonci of the Irechikwa Ts'intsuntsani in Mesoamerica, in what is now Mexico. He was the nephew of Tariácuri. His rule began around ~1430 and ended in 1454.

References 

15th-century monarchs in North America
Purépecha people